Harold Carlyle Bower (5 May 1878 – 22 May 1954) was an Australian rules footballer who played with South Melbourne in the Victorian Football League (VFL).

Notes

External links 

1878 births
1954 deaths
Australian rules footballers from Melbourne
Sydney Swans players
People from South Melbourne